The Adikesava Perumal Temple is a Hindu temple located in Thiruvattar, Kanyakumari district, Tamil Nadu, India and is one of the 108 Divya desams, the holy sites of Hindu Vaishnavism according to existing Tamil hymns from the seventh and eighth centuries C.E. The temple is one of the historic thirteen Divya Deshams of Malai Nadu. The temple is a picturesque setting surrounded on three sides by rivers namely, (River Kothai, River Pahrali and River Thamirabarani) It was the Rajya Temple and Bharadevatha shrine of Erstwhile Travancore. After state reorganisation, the temple handed over to Tamilnadu H&RCE Dept. The presiding Vishnu in the form of Ananthapadmabhan/Adikeshavaperumal is believed to be older than Padmanabhaswamy Temple in Thiruvananthapuram. Since Vishnu resides here in a reclining position, and is surrounded by rivers, the temple is called as "The Srirangam of Chera Kingdom".

The temple  was consecrated by Parasurama and is admired by Veda vyasa in the sections which deal with temples in Padma Purana. As per the stone inscriptions which dates back to 779 KE the temple is established in the Treta yuga. The Adikeshava temple is also where Chaitanya Mahaprabhu, founder of the Gaudiya Vaishnava movement, discovered the lost manuscript of the Brahma Samhita.

Architecture and history

The temple architecture is Dravidian style architecture with wooden pillars, doors and roofs. The Temple is surrounded by a thirty-feet-high fort wall. The outer corridor stand on 224 stone pillars. The adjacent forward facing mandapams includes sculptures and art works which depicts events from Ramayana. It also portrays Gods and goddesses from Hindu mythology including  Shiva, Parvati and Sri Krishna etc. The lord is lying on his snake couch and has to be viewed through three doors. We could see Lord Shiva near Lord Adikesava Perumal inside the sannidhi. Deepalakshmis are many but none resembles the other. The Otraikkal Mandapam (single stone hall) made of a single stone 3 feet thick, is a marvel. Oorthuva Thandavam, Venugopala, Rathi, Manmatha, Lakshmana and Indrajit are excellently carved. The temple is also renowned for its murals.

The composite columns of Virabhadra holding sword and horn are found be additions of the Vijayanagara kings during the early 1500s. Similar columns of Virabhadra are found in Meenakshi Temple at Madurai, Nellaiappar Temple at Tirunelveli, Kasi Viswanathar temple at Tenkasi, Krishnapuram Venkatachalapathy temple, Ramanathaswamy Temple at Rameswaram, Soundararajaperumal temple at Thadikombu, Srivilliputhur Andal temple, Srivaikuntanathan Perumal temple at Srivaikuntam, Avudayarkovil, Vaishnava Nambi and Thirukurungudivalli Nachiar temple at Thirukkurungudi.

The temple complex includes a Ayyappan temple behind which stands the Ksetra bala Balikkal. It also includes Sree Bali Prakaram and the Yanaikottil. Other deities being located in the south-western corner, the flagmast is located at the west at the  Sree Balippura. As per the stone inscriptions in the pedestal of the flag mast it was renovated by Sree Moolam Thirunal Rama Varma VI in 1071 KE.  The granite entrance of the Chitra Sabha  includes sculptures of the Dwara Palakas, Jaya and Vijaya. Sculptures of Lakshmana and Pathanjali Tandava carved to the left of Sabha Mandapam while that of Indrajith, Muralidhara and Kalabairava are carved  to the right. The image of the chief deity in his sayana posture, is sculpted on the wooden entrance door. Vatteluttu incriptions of Shilpa Shastra are found in adjacent walls. It also includes details about the 11th century Chola King Rajendra Chola.  

Sculptures  of Rati and Manmadan is found opposite Udaya Marthanda Mandapam.  The epic scenes Vinayaka Kalyanam, Bharata War and deities Varuna, Niriyati, Yama, Kubera, Indra, Agni, Brahma and Monks in penance are sculpted in a row above the Mandapam. A variety of mural painting are found along the walls of the inner prakarams. A secret passage leading to the Palace is found beneath the west of the inner prakarams which is covered with a large stone slab.  

Going by extant legends, the temple is closely associated with the famous Sree Anantha Padmanabhaswamy Temple, Thiruvananthapuram. Thiruvananthapuram Sri Anantha Padmanabhaswamy temple deity lies in the direction as to see the Thiruvattar Adi kesava deity. The main deity was originally covered with gold kavachams in which diamonds and other precious stones were embedded which the Kerala kings had presented to the temple. There is also a small shrine for Lord Lakshmi Narasimhaswamy near the river and opposite to the Adikesava Perumal Temple. Alvar saint Nammalvar had sung 11 pasurams in praise of Adi Kesava Swamy in the 6th Thiruvai mozhi. There are Three temples related to Adikesava Perumal Temple. It is believed that, the Moolasthanam of all three temples such as Padmanabhaswamy temple, Thiruvananthapuram; Adikesava Perumal Temple, Thiruvattar and Sri Ranganathaswamy Temple, Srirangam is Ananthapadmanabhaswamy Temple or Anantha Lake Temple near Kumbla in Manjeshwaram Taluk of Kasaragod District of Kerala, South India.

Treasures and connections

The entire present day Kanyakumari District formed part of erstwhile Travancore Kingdom. Up to Marthanda Varma, all kings ruled the erstwhile Venad Kingdom (which was expanded by Marthanda Varma to form Thiruvithaamkoor) from Padmanabhapuram in Kanyakumari District. It was Dharma Raja, the nephew and successor of Marthanda Varma, who shifted the capital to Thiruvananthapuram. Padmanabhapuram Palace, the erstwhile royal abode of Travancore Kings, is still preserved in all its glory and is situated at Padmanabhapuram in Kalkulam Taluk of Kanyakumari District. Marthanda Varma was a staunch devotee of Lord Adikesava and used to worship at the temple before all the major war campaigns undertaken by him.

The presiding Deities of Thiruvattar, Thiruvananthapuram and Thiruvalla had a three-cornered connection which reflects in the quantitative measurement of commodities utilised etc.
The Perumals of Thiruvattar and Thiruvananthapuram remain closely bound to each other with this closeness being mirrored not only in festivals which coincide, special days and many rituals but also in the structural pattern including the Ottakkal Mandapam. In both cases the Moola Vigrahas are of Katu-Sarkara and are containing Salagramas. The strong affiliation of the Venad kings to both Thiruvattar and Thiruvananthapuram temples in their privileges and responsibilities provide ample evidence of enduring interconnections. Many ceremonies had to be initially performed at Sree AdiKesava Temple before being conducted at the Padmanabha Swamy Temple.

Legend
The Lord AdiKesavaSwamy means 'Foremost Friend'. Legend says that Lord AdiKesavaSwamy defeated the demon Kesi. The demon's wife prayed to the River Ganges and to River Thamirabarani and created a destruction. But it was in vain and she surrendered to the Lord. Thus, the formation of the rivers made in a circle came to be known as Thiruvattaru.

On 10 June 1741, Anizham Tirunal Marthanda Varma, the then ruler of Travancore, before going for the Battle of Colachel offered 908 panams, yataghan, and silk on the feet of Lord Adikesava and prayed for victory.

Festivals and prasadhams
Vaikunta Ekadesi is celebrated with pomp and glory. Paal Payasam (Milk Kheer), Aval and Appam are delicious prasadams at this temple. The pujas are done in the same manner as that of the Sri Padmanabhaswamy temple, Thiruvananthapuram.

References

 Aswathi Thirunal Gouri Lakshmi Bayi (1995), Sree Padmanabha Swamy Temple, Bharatiya Vidya Bhavan, Kulapati Munshi Marg, Mumbai.
 K.V. Ramachandran Nair (2011), Thiruvattar Adikesava Perumal Kshethra Mahathmiyam, Published by Author, Thiruvattar.

Citations

External links

https://web.archive.org/web/20080117091347/http://www.sriadikesava.org/
http://www.srivari.com/malayalatirupathigal/thiruvattaru.htm

 
Hindu temples in Kanyakumari district